Shah Abu ol Qasem (also Romanized as Shāh Abū ol Qāsem) is a village in Soltanabad Rural District, in the Central District of Ramhormoz County, Khuzestan Province, Iran. At the 2006 census, its population was 558, in 87 families.

References 

Populated places in Ramhormoz County